is a Japanese musician keyboard player, arranger, and producer from Tokyo.

He is the composer, keyboardist, arranger and musical producer for artists such as Yo Hitoto, Miki Imai, Tomomi Kahara, JUJU, Yuzu and Ken Hirai, among others. He has also been a music director and supervisor for several TV programs.

In 2006 he was a part of a special unit called Kokua, together with other Japanese musicians, to record the theme song for a NHK documentary program. In 2016 the members reunited to celebrate the 10th anniversary of the release of the single Progress, and recorded a new album, Progress, the 1st official album of the group

References

External links 
 Kokua Sony Music Official site (Japanese)
 Kokua Speedstar Records Official site (Japanese)
 The Professionals Official site (English)
 Professional Shigoto no Ryuugi Official site (Japanese)

1957 births
Living people
Japanese keyboardists
Musicians from Tokyo
Kokua members